Ana de Oliveira Barros (born 5 February 1973) is a road cyclist from Portugal. She represented her nation at the 1996 Summer Olympics in the women's road race.

References

External links
 profile at sports-reference.com

Portuguese female cyclists
Cyclists at the 1996 Summer Olympics
Olympic cyclists of Portugal
Living people
Place of birth missing (living people)
1973 births